Jeffris may refer to:

Jeffris, Wisconsin, an unincorporated community in Harrison, Lincoln County, Wisconsin, United States
Jeffris Hopkins (born 1950), Welsh cricketer